Gabriel Héctor Fernández (born 22 September 1977 in Bragado) is an Argentine former professional footballer.

References

External links
 Gabriel Héctor Fernández at BDFA.com.ar 

1977 births
Living people
Sportspeople from Buenos Aires Province
Association football midfielders
Argentine footballers
SC Bastia players
C.D. Olmedo footballers
Santiago Morning footballers
Magallanes footballers
Millonarios F.C. players
Atlético Junior footballers
C.S. Emelec footballers
TuS Koblenz players
América de Cali footballers
Deportivo Cali footballers
Ligue 1 players
2. Bundesliga players
Categoría Primera A players
Ecuadorian Serie A players
Expatriate footballers in Chile
Expatriate footballers in Colombia
Expatriate footballers in Ecuador
Expatriate footballers in Germany
Argentine expatriate sportspeople in Chile
Argentine expatriate sportspeople in Germany
Argentine expatriate sportspeople in Colombia
Argentine expatriate sportspeople in Ecuador
Argentine expatriate footballers